James Hill (born October 25, 1974) is a former professional American football tight end. He played ten games in the 2000 NFL season with the Seattle Seahawks and six games with the Amsterdam Admirals, before suffering a broken leg. Hill is an alumnus of Abilene Christian University. He played high school football for Riverhead High School in Riverhead, New York.

External links
NFL.com player page

1974 births
Living people
American football tight ends
Abilene Christian University alumni
Abilene Christian Wildcats football players
Seattle Seahawks players
Amsterdam Admirals players
Players of American football from Dallas